The Mouansa Synagogue is located in the village of Mouansa, located just west of Zarzis, Tunisia.

The synagogue together with the nearby Jewish cemetery is all that remains of the Jewish community of the village which disbanded during the 1970s.

See also
 List of synagogues in Tunisia

Orthodox Judaism in North Africa
Orthodox synagogues in Tunisia
Sephardi Jewish culture in North Africa
Sephardi synagogues
Zarzis
Former synagogues in Tunisia